Charles Christopher Allen (born August 1958) is a British designer. He is a third-generation tailor.

Education
Allen was educated at Highbury Grove School (under Rhodes Boyson) and at the Chelsea School of Art where he earned a diploma of art & design. At Chelsea School of Art, Allen specialised in painting and silk-screen printing.

In 1982, he graduated with a Master of Art in Menswear Design from the Royal College of Art since when he has been practising, in varying forms, as a tailor and designer.

Career
Allen was a winner of the International Linen Designer of the Year award and was Head of Menswear at the Royal College of Art (R.C.A.) from 1994 to 1997.

References

Men's Wear, 2 July 1981;
West Indian News, 19 March 1986, by Jeff Lee;
PRIDE, February/March 1995, by Ameachi Odiatu;
Charlie Allen|Tailor and England kit designer, in Football Focus Europe, Issue 04, by Robbie Thompson;
H & H, series I, 5 September 1997, by Gareth Davies;

UNTOLD, June/July 2001, by Peter Akinti;
The style interview, ARENA, July 2002;
Charlie chosen to overhaul top tailor, by Stephen Lucas in the Highbury & Islington Express, 25 October 2002;
Bob Jerrard, David Hands, & Jack Ingram, Design Management Case Studies, Routledge/Psychology Press, 2002 .
Allen is Case Study 5, pages 126-182, Branding in the fashion industry: Charles Allen Menswear. This study includes 10 figures and 15 tables relating to Allen;
The thinking man's tailor, profile in Drapers, by Diana Whitehead, 17 May 2003;
Frances Ross, Refashioning London Tailors; A study of new textiles, Design and technology in men's contemporary fashion, University of the Arts, London, London College of Fashion, School of Fashion Promotion and Management, London, 2005 ;
mwb, October 2006, by Tom Bottomley;
Capello calls up Savile Row, Jonathan Owen in The Independent on Sunday, 15 March 2009;
40 years of shirt, England's 40th new kit since 66.. and the most expensive, in the Daily Mirror, 16 March 2009, by Will Payne;
Simon Mills in The Guardian, 31 March 2009;
It's just Fabio for top tailor Charlie, by Duncan Hepburn, in the Islington Gazette, 2 July 2009;
A stylish cut...Asda to sell 'Savile Row' suit for £79, in the Evening Standard, 2 September 2010, by Terry Kirby & Karen Dacre;
Stuart Jeffries, in The Guardian, 4 January 2011.

External links
Allen's website
At ASDA's George

1958 births
Living people
Luxury brands
Shops in London
Clothing brands of the United Kingdom
People from Islington (district)
High fashion brands
British tailors
English fashion designers
Alumni of the Royal College of Art
Alumni of Chelsea College of Arts
Menswear designers
Black British fashion people